The 1941 Pacific Tigers football team represented the College of the Pacific—now known as the University of the Pacific—in Stockton, California as a member of the Far Western Conference (FWC) during the 1941 college football season. Led by ninth-year head coach Amos Alonzo Stagg, Pacific compiled an overall record of 4–7 with a mark of 3–0 in conference play, winning the FWC title. The team was outscored by its opponents 100 to 72 for the season. The Tigers played home games at Baxter Stadium in Stockton.

During a September 24 game against Hawaii in Stockton, a distressed army flying cadet tried to land his plane at the stadium, diving for 30 minutes "a few feet over the heads of terrified spectators and players and clipped the stadium power line, darkening the field." The cadet ultimately landed his plane safely in the stadium parking lot.

Schedule

References

Pacific
Pacific Tigers football seasons
Northern California Athletic Conference football champion seasons
Pacific Tigers football